Rita Asfour (February 9, 1933 – June 29, 2021) was an American modern artist. She was known for her colorful aesthetic paintings of the human figure. Rita projected life and movement by the strength of her compositions. Feminine mystique and sensuality were her trademark.

In Egypt, her high school education was in a French school. In 1959, she received a BA from the Italian Art Institute Leonardo Da Vinci.

After graduation her first job was in Beirut, Lebanon. She started as an illustrator and ended being the art director of a weekly magazine. After five years, she was in search of a bigger artistic challenge.

Rita immigrated to the United States in 1965 and found a job in Los Angeles at Universal Studio Tours, sketching pastel portraits of visiting tourists. Another major event that same year was her marriage to an aerospace engineer, Jeffrey Asfour.

California was her home for the next forty-seven years. She was free to paint what she wanted. Free strokes and bold colors appeared in her landscapes. The thirty years she lived in Malibu were her most prolific and creative.

In 2012, at the age of seventy-nine, Rita retired in Las Vegas. But went back to painting after seeing a spectacular Las Vegas showgirls review. The University of Nevada exhibited her new paintings in 2016. Public Television in 2017 aired a half-hour documentary about her long artistic career.

Rita continued to paint until 2021. She died on June 29, 2021, after an accident that caused a broken leg.

Early life 

Rita Asfour was born on February 9, 1933, in Cairo, Egypt. Her maiden name is Markrit Thomassian.

Her Armenian father, Kaspar Thomassian, was born in Turkey in 1901. Her Syrian mother, Gamila Khoury, was born in Aleppo, Syria in 1905. Her parents escaped the holocaust and ravages of World War I and ended refugees down sought in Egypt where Rita was born. 

Rita was the second of three children. Her elementary school was run by French nuns and her high school education was at the Lycée Français.

In the middle of World War II, in 1941, Hitler bombed Cairo trying to gain access to the Suez Canal. Rita was then eight years old. She remembers the air raids and crying under her bed. In school, her friends sketched bombs falling, but she painted flowers and happy faces. That was when she started drawing to express herself.

Education 
After finishing high school, Rita spent six years studying art at Leonardo da Vinci's Scuola Internazionale Italiana, from where she graduated in 1959 with a BA.
 
In the United States in 1968, she took private lessons from Samuel Markitante (1887-1975), who was a French artist, living in Santa Monica, California. His specialty was Landscapes with thick layers of paint on board to give a three-dimensional effect.

In 1969, Rita attended several classes at the Otis College of Art and Design in Los Angeles, California.

Career 

Rita Asfour began her career as an impressionist. She was educated at Leonardo Da Vinci Art Academy and travelled from Africa to America, via Asia and Europe, to pursue her goals. These travels influenced her artistic style.

Cairo (1933–1960) 

While studying in college, Rita got a part-time job at a leading magazine as a colorist.  She would get black and white pencil illustrations and use watercolors to make them stand out.

Beirut (1960–1965) 

Rita’s first full-time job was in Beirut, Lebanon. She was hired as an illustrator in a popular entertainment magazine and ended up being the art director. Her schedule was busy with contributions to a children's magazine and illustrating covers of paperback thrillers. However, her opportunities were limited so she decided to emigrate with her existing portfolio.

Los Angeles (1965–1982) 

Rita immigrated to the United States in 1965. She went to California, where she easily found a job at Universal City Studio Tours, sketching pastel portraits of tourists, for $15 each.

Whenever she could, she would buy paint and canvas to start a new portfolio. Three years later, in 1968, she presented a dozen paintings to W&J Sloane in Beverly Hills, which they accepted on consignment. Collectors included Donna Reed and Ella Fitzgerald.

In 1971, Rita opened her own art gallery, Galerie Camille, on Canon Drive in Beverly Hills. Besides selling her paintings, she was commissioned portraits of Tricia Nixon, Otis Chandler, and others.

Two years later she gave birth to her daughter Amber and stayed home to take care of her only child. She continued painting. Dealers went to her house and purchased what she offered for sale.

In 1980, Rita made a dozen sculptures in plaster, and a few were cast in paper. She made only one in bronze but did not continue because the process was too complicated and involved too many people.

Art Expo 1981 in San Francisco was the first of many Art Expos in which she exhibited and sold her paintings.

Malibu (1982–2012) 

Rita’s thirty years in Malibu were formative and happy. Her career was on the move, her young daughter was growing up, her mother came to visit, she had cats and dogs, and was very busy.

Rita exhibited in shows. Sold to dealers. Interacted with the public. Advertised in print magazines. Released serigraphs and lithographs.

In 1991, Rita had a show at Lumina Art Gallery, in Trenton, New Jersey. That gallery was owned by John Salvo, who later became manager of the Martin Lawrence Galleries in Soho, New York. John bought and owns two of Rita’s paintings

But – Rita’s passion was somewhere else - so she stopped all that activity and went back to painting.

Subsequently, her canvases became larger.  Her style freer. Her colors brighter. Her subjects bolder. Her collection richer. Her landscapes vibrant. Her portraits piercing.

To do all that, Rita had to spend a lot of quiet time alone in her studio. She enjoyed this new privacy over her previous activities in the limelight. With time, her preference for privacy grew more and more.

Even her ballerinas had a different look after she saw the Pepperdine University ballet students shuffling around backstage before real performances. They were stressed, and that is how she portrayed them in her new ballerina paintings.

Rita painted twelve images of Malibu landmarks, put them in a 2006 calendar that she printed and sold, then donated all the proceeds to the Los Angeles County Sherriff’s Office.

Las Vegas (2012–2021) 

Rita retired in Las Vegas in 2012, to relax in its world of entertainment, and to go back to where she was married in 1965.

Bally’s Hotel had a spectacular showgirl extravaganza called Jubilee. Rita went there and was overwhelmed. She went there a second time, and from there to the art store to buy new paint and canvas.

She painted showgirls from that moment on, until 2021 when she left a half-finished painting on her easel.

 

Las Vegas Showgirls is a short documentary that shows how Rita started her showgirl’s collection.

In August 2016 the University of Nevada in Las Vegas had a six-month exhibition of Rita’s showgirl paintings.

One year later, in 2017, Public Television aired a half-hour documentary about Rita’s life-long journey in the art world.

Academia and Public Television 

In 2016, Dr. Robert Tracy, from the department of Fine Arts at the University of Nevada in Las Vegas, heard about Rita living in Las Vegas and painting Las Vegas showgirls. He went to her house, carefully examined the paintings, and was impressed with the way she portrayed the dancers floating in air. He came back, interviewed Rita again, and noted that she had a large collection of ballet dancers. It was then that he decided to curate Rita’s collections and have an exhibit for her showgirl and ballerina dancers on the university campus.

The exhibition lasted six months, and the opening ceremony was accompanied by ballet students from the university dance department, as well as a parade by professional showgirls displaying the usual costumes and feathers. The Exhibition Guide was named by Dr. Tracy, titled, “Rita Asfour – Her Way!”

In 2017, PBS in Las Vegas aired a half-hour documentary about Rita’s life, titled, “Rita Asfour: Art Her Way.”

Later in 2021, Rita was featured in a one-hour Vegas PBS documentary about showgirls, titled, “The Showgirl: A Las Vegas Icon.”

The recognition by Academia at the university and by public television was a noteworthy statement, in and by itself, that Rita found very pleasing.

Travels 

Rita travelled to Europe many times. She went to France, Italy, Greece, and worked in Koln, Germany. Her other travels included Canada, Mexico, Hawaii, and Alaska.

In 1969, she went to Tahiti, where she spent time in the museum of Paul Gaugin. She studied his originals very closely, especially his free lines and colors.

Personal life 

Rita never wanted to get married or have children. But an aerospace engineer changed her mind,  after which they were married in November 1965, at the Tropicana Hotel, Las Vegas. And in 1973 she gave birth to one child named Amber.

Rita was a good wife and mother, loved to cook, and tailored some of her clothes. She loved cats and dogs and always had one or two in her studio while painting. Rita spoke few words but with wit and humor.

Her friends were her paintings.  

Watching documentaries about Mary Cassatt and other impressionists was her pastime on television.

She was proud to have crossed four continents to pursue a childhood dream come true. Working alone, and without collaborating with anyone or joining any art group, Rita left behind a large collection of beautiful aesthetic art.

Painting was not a job for her but a mission. Among her last words Rita said, “I did it. And I did it my way. I said all I had to say. If you don’t understand it, too bad.”

A paint brush was in her hand for eighty years, from age eight until eighty-eight. Rita continued to paint until two months before she died on June 29, 2021, in Las Vegas, Nevada.

Philanthropy 

In 1965, Rita donated thirty paintings to the City of Hope in Los Angeles.

In 2003, Rita donated paintings and prints to the Leukemia Society in Pittsburgh.

In 2006, Rita donated all the proceeds from her 2006 Malibu Landmarks Calendar to the Sherriff’s Department in Malibu.

In 2020, Rita donated Cash and prints to PBS in Las Vegas.

Legacy 

Dr. Robert Tracy, Ph.D., Curator, College of Fine Arts, UNLV, said, “Rita Asfour’s legacy will be that of an enabled artist who never gave up on doing it – Her Way! Rita’s success is that she is not driven by monetary success or notoriety. Rita is first and foremost a free and curious spirit.”

Professor Sean Clark, Associate Dean, College of Fine Arts, UNLV, said, “Rita Asfour’s work embodies the spirit of Vegas glamour, in the same way Toulouse Lautrec captured the allure of the Moulin Rouge in 19th century Paris.”

Dr. Nancy J. Uscher, Ph.D., Dean, College of Fine Arts, UNLV said, “When you have a visionary brilliant artist like Rita Asfour, she will find the right medium to express her ideas.”

Publications

2022 

 Rita Asfour, Impressionist – Out of Print
 Rita Asfour – Everlasting Impressions by Dr. Robert Tracy, UNLV curator.
 Rita Asfour – Ballerinas and Showgirls, by Dr. Robert Tracy, UNLV curator.
 2017

 Rita Asfour – PBS Documentary, Video

2016 

 Rita Asfour, Her Way - An Exhibition Guidebook by Dr. Robert Tracy, UNLV curator.

1993 

 The Art of Giving - The Leukemia Society of America
 Sunstorm Fine Art Magazine - Pure Visual Sensation - by Kathleen Heiser

1992 

 Art Expo Preview - Facing Market Challenges, by Deborah K. Swanson
 Southwest Art Gallery Magazine - Real Art - by Rita Asfour
 The Art of Giving - The Leukemia Society of America

1991 

 Sunstorm Fine Art Magazine - The New Impressionists - by Andrew C. Voth

1971 

 Lincoln Day Celebration - Cover art
 Los Angeles Magazine - Art Happenings
 The Beverly Hills Courier - Marjorie Walker

1968 

 W&J Sloane Exhibition Brochure

Exhibitions (solo)

Rita Asfour Exhibitions: 2010 - 2019 

 2016 – Healy Hayes Gallery, UNLV

Rita Asfour Exhibitions: 1990 - 1999 

 1990 – Artexpo - New York, New York
 1990 – Artexpo – Los Angeles, California
 1990 – Art To Art Galleries - Studio City, California
 1991 – Artexpo - New York, New York
 1991 – Connoisseur Gallery - La Jolla, California
 1991 – Artexpo – Los Angeles, California
 1991 – Atlas Galleries - Chicago, Illinois
 1991 – Village Gallery - Breckenridge, Colorado
 1991 – Lumina Art Gallery - Trenton, New Jersey
 1992 – Rhapsody Fine Art - West Hollywood, California
 1992 – Globe Art Distributors, Ontario, Canada
 1992 – Modern Art Gallery – Japan
 1993 – Allan Art - Singapore
 1994 – Vail Fine Art - Edwards, Colorado
 1997 – Wentworth Galleries - Nationwide, USA

Rita Asfour Exhibitions: 1980 - 1989 

 1980 – Wally Findlay Galleries - Beverly Hills, California
 1981 – Art Expo - San Francisco, California
 1989 – Rhapsody Fine Art - West Hollywood, California

Rita Asfour Exhibitions: 1970 - 1979 

 1970 – House of Hartford Gallery - Beverly Hills, California
 1971 – Galerie Camille - Beverly Hills, California
 1973 – World of Art Gallery - Scottsdale, Arizona
 1973 – La Pasada Gallery - Sedona, Arizona
 1977 – Mejika Galleries - Santa Monica, California

References

External links 
 Official website
 Foundation Website

1933 births
2021 deaths
American women painters
American Impressionist painters
21st-century American women artists